The 2015/2016 season was the 24th season of the Belarusian Men's Handball Championship. HC Meshkov Brest were the defending champions. The season was held in 3 stages.

First stage

Teams were divided into 2 groups:

 Group 1: SKA Minsk, GK Gomel, Kronon Grodno, Masheka Mogilev, GK im. Levin Novopolotsk
 Group 2: Meshkov Brest 2, RGUOR-SKA, RCOR, SKA-Suvorov

During this stage each team played the others: in Group 1 – 4 times, in Group 2 – 6 times. HC Meshkov Brest as defending champions of the 2014/2015 season skipped this stage.

Results

Group 1

Group 2

Second stage

According to the results of the first stage were formed 3 groups:

 Group A: HC Meshkov Brest, 1st, 2nd and 3rd places of Group 1
 Group B: rest teams of Group 1, 1st place of Group 2 and Belarus national handball U-18 team (on a non-competitive basis)
 Group C: rest teams of Group 2

At the end of the stage in Group B were determined the places from 5th to 7th in the championship, in the Group C – the places from 8th to 10th in the championship.

Results

Group A

Group B

Group C

∗ RCOR scored more points in personal matches against RGUOR-SKA (10-8) and therefore stands above

Third stage (Playoffs)

According to the final positions in Group A were formed semi-final pairs up as follows:

 3rd place - 2nd place
 4th place - 1st place

Winners of the semi-final pairs played in the final round, where competed for the gold and silver medals of the championship. Defeated in semi-finals teams competed for the bronze medals. The semi-finals were held up to two wins one of the teams, the final round - up to three wins.

Results

Semi-finals

Third place

Final

Results of the season

Handball in Belarus
Sports competitions in Belarus